Komus is a Russian chain store and manufacturing company. It supplies goods for office and school, office furniture and equipment, paper and paperboard, plastic package, medical consumables and provides printing services. Its headquarters are in Moscow.

History 
Komus was established in 1990 as a students' cooperative. The company's name represents an abbreviation from Russian коммерческие услуги (translit. kommercheskie uslugi) meaning  commercial services.

Ownership 
The main owner of the company is its General Director Sergey Bobrikov (96%).

Slogan 
The company's slogan is Komus Only! Confidence Since Childhood!

Business activity 
The company has a network of stores in Russia supplying  products for office and school use - over 70 stores in 17 regions of Russia.

External links 

 
 Office goods wholesale division
 Medical consumables division
 Printing paper and cardboard division
 Plastic package division

Retail companies of Russia
Companies based in Moscow
Russian brands